These are the Australian Country number-one albums of 2010, per the ARIA Charts.

See also
2010 in music
List of number-one albums of 2010 (Australia)

References

2010
Australia country albums
Number-one country albums